In chess and chess variants, a bare king (or lone king) is a game position where one player has only the king remaining (i.e. all the player's other pieces have been ).

Effect on the game

Historical
In some old versions of chess, such as "baring chess"  and shatranj, leaving the opponent with a bare king was one way of winning the game (see Checkmate#History). The relative weakness of the pieces in shatranj may have made this form of a win desirable. A possible exception to the bare king rule was if the king immediately after being bared was able to recapture, leaving the opponent with a bare king as well. This situation, called a "Medinese victory", was often considered a draw.

Contemporary
Under modern rules, a player with a bare king does not automatically lose and may continue playing. A bare king can never give check, however, and can therefore never deliver a checkmate or win the game. A bare king can in some situations play to a draw, such as by stalemate or if the opponent of a bare king oversteps the time limit. If both players are left with a bare king, the game is immediately drawn.  Similarly, if one player has only a king and either a bishop or a knight while the opponent has a bare king, the game is immediately drawn.

References

Bibliography

Rules of chess